Lake of the Woods Estates is a subdivision of approximately 400 in Champaign County, Illinois.. The neighborhood is governed by a homeowners association.

Created by real estate developer Harold Jenn in the 1960s, Lake of the Woods Estates was at the beginning of a decades-long population shift towards the north in Peoria, a trend that continues today.

The dividing line between Dunlap Community Unit School District 323 and Illinois Valley Central Unit District 321 runs through the subdivision.  The subdivision lies within Medina Township, which supplies most of the governmental services.

See also
 Peoria metropolitan area

Unincorporated communities in Illinois
Unincorporated communities in Peoria County, Illinois
Peoria metropolitan area, Illinois
Populated places established in the 1960s